Whalan may refer to:

 Whalan (surname)
 Whalan, Minnesota
 Whalan, New South Wales

See also
 Whalen (disambiguation)